Mount Pleasant Regional Airport may refer to:
				
Mount Pleasant Regional Airport (South Carolina) in Mount Pleasant, South Carolina, United States (FAA: LRO)
Mount Pleasant Regional Airport (Texas) in Mount Pleasant, Texas, United States (FAA: OSA)

See also
Mount Pleasant Airport (disambiguation)
Mount Pleasant Municipal Airport (disambiguation)